John Adams (July 1, 1825 – November 30, 1864) was an officer in the United States Army. With the onset of the American Civil War, he resigned his commission and joined the Confederate States Army, rising to the rank of brigadier general before being killed in action.

Early life and career
Adams was born to Irish immigrant parents in Nashville, Tennessee, on July 1, 1825; by some other sources he was born in Pulaski, Tennessee, on February 8, 1825.

He graduated from the United States Military Academy in 1846, ranking 25th in his class. He was commissioned as a second lieutenant in the 1st Dragoons, serving under Capt. Philip Kearny. Adams was brevetted first lieutenant for gallantry during the Mexican–American War at the Battle of Santa Cruz de Rosales. After the war, Adams served on the western frontier, primarily in California, reaching the rank of captain. As a lieutenant colonel in the state militia, he was aide-de-camp to the Governor of Minnesota in 1853.

Civil War Career
With the secession of Tennessee, Adams resigned his commission in the United States Army in early 1861 and joined the Confederate Army not long afterward as a captain in the cavalry. He was commissioned a colonel in 1862, and a brigadier general in December of that same year, replacing the late Lloyd Tilghman in charge of his brigade of infantry. Adams served entirely in the Western Theater and was commended in several official reports for his leadership. He was particularly conspicuous during the Atlanta Campaign, where he again displayed personal bravery as well as a talent for battlefield tactics. His brigade was selected to lead the advance of John Bell Hood's army into Tennessee.

Adams was killed at the Second Battle of Franklin on November 30, 1864, one of six Confederate generals to perish in the defeat. An Indiana colonel who witnessed his death later wrote:

General Adams rode up to our works and, cheering his men, made an attempt to leap his horse over them. The horse fell upon the top of the embankment and the general was caught under him, pierced with [nine] bullets. As soon as the charge was repulsed, our men sprang over the works and lifted the horse, while others dragged the general from under him. He was perfectly conscious and knew his fate. He asked for water, as all dying men do in battle as the life-blood drips from the body. One of my men gave him a canteen of water, while another brought an armful of cotton from an old gin near by and made him a pillow. The general gallantly thanked them, and in answer to our expressions of sorrow at his sad fate, he said, 'It is the fate of a soldier to die for his country,' and expired. — Confederate Veteran, June 1897.

Adams left a widow with four sons and two daughters.

See also
List of American Civil War generals (Confederate)

References

Sources
 
  
 Who Was Who in America: Historical Volume, 1607-1896. Chicago: Marquis Who's Who, 1963.

Further reading
 Brown, Campbell H., "The Myth of the 5 Dead Generals." Civil War Times Illustrated Volume 8, August 1969.
 Lane, Bryan, "The Familiar Road: The Life of Confederate Brigadier General John Adams." Civil War Times Illustrated, Volume 35, October 1996.
 Tucker, Leslie R., "Brigadier General John Adams, CSA, A Biography.", McFarland & Company, Incorporated Publishers, 2013.

External links
 
 

1825 births
1864 deaths
People from Nashville, Tennessee
United States Military Academy alumni
People of Tennessee in the American Civil War
United States Army officers
Confederate States Army brigadier generals
Confederate States of America military personnel killed in the American Civil War
American people of Irish descent
American military personnel of the Mexican–American War